Urdish (or Urglish), a portmanteau of Urdu and English, is the macaronic hybrid use of English and Urdu in Pakistan, involving code-switching between these languages whereby they are freely interchanged within a sentence or between sentences. The term Urdish is first recorded in 1989. Other less common colloquial portmanteau words for Urdish include (chronologically): Urglish (recorded from 1995), Urdlish (1997) and Urduish (1998).

Many bilingual or multi-lingual Urdu speakers, being familiar with both Urdu and English, display code-switching in certain localities and between certain social groups. When Urdu–Hindi is viewed as a single spoken language called Hindostani, the portmanteaus Urdish and Hinglish mean the same code-mixed tongue, where the former term is used predominantly in Pakistan and the latter term predominantly in modern India.

On 14 August 2015, the Government of Pakistan launched the Ilm Pakistan movement, with a uniform curriculum in Urdish. Ahsan Iqbal, Federal Minister of Pakistan, said, "Now the government is working on a new curriculum to provide a new medium to the students which will be the combination of both Urdu and English and will name it Urdish."

References

Urdu
Macaronic forms of English
Pakistani English